The 2015 Vancouver Whitecaps FC season is the Whitecaps' fifth season in Major League Soccer, the top tier of soccer in the United States and Canada.

Season overview

December

Current roster

Transfers

In

Out

Technical staff

Management

Major League Soccer

Preseason

Regular season

Results

Tables

Western Conference

Overall

Playoffs

Conference semifinals

CONCACAF Champions League

Group stage

Canadian Championship

Semi-finals

Finals

Cascadia Cup 

The 2015 Cascadia Cup will feature nine matches total, six of which feature the Whitecaps, three of which will be hosted at BC Place: two against Seattle Sounders FC, and one versus the Portland Timbers. Portland will host two matches at Providence Park, and Seattle will host one at CenturyLink Field.

See also 
 2015 Whitecaps FC 2 season

References 

2015
2015 Major League Soccer season
2015 in Canadian sports
2015 in British Columbia
Canadian soccer clubs 2015 season